The Professional Wrestling Hall of Fame (PWHF) and Museum is an American professional wrestling hall of fame and museum located in Wichita Falls, Texas currently closed to water leaks. The museum was founded by Tony Vellano in 1999, and was previously in Amsterdam, New York and Schenectady, New York. Its purpose is to "preserve and promote the dignified history of professional wrestling and to enshrine and pay tribute to professional wrestlers who have advanced this national pastime in terms of athletics and entertainment." It is not affiliated with any promotion.

Categories

Inductees

See also
List of professional wrestling conventions
International Professional Wrestling Hall of Fame

References

External links
PWHF.org official website

 
Awards established in 2002
Museums in Montgomery County, New York
Professional wrestling-related lists
Sports museums in New York (state)
2002 establishments in New York City